The St. Louis Intercollegiate Athletic Conference (SLIAC) is an NCAA Division III collegiate athletic conference in the Midwestern and SouthernUnited States.  There are 9 full member institutions as of 2022.

History

Chronological timeline
Source:

 September 1989: The SLIAC chartered with Blackburn, Fontbonne, Maryville, Parks, Principia, and Webster the original members. 
 September 1990: The SLIAC's first year gets underway. MacMurray and Westminster join the charter members. 
 February 1991: The first SLIAC men's basketball tournament is held.
 February 1995: Westminster wins the men's basketball tournament title to earn the SLIAC's first automatic bid to an NCAA Division III national championship event.
 September 1995: Greenville begins its first year as a member of the conference, bringing SLIAC membership to nine schools.
 March 1996: MacMurray wins the women's basketball tournament title to earn the conference's first automatic bid to an NCAA Division III women's national championship event.
 April 1996: Parks competes in its final conference event. Parks closed after the 1995-96 year and its academic programs were moved to the Saint Louis University campus.
 November 1996: Blackburn, MacMurray, and Westminster share the first-ever SLIAC football title.
 September 1999: The SLIAC begins its tenth year of operation.
 November 1999: The fourth and final (until 2008) conference football title is awarded (six teams needed for conference to sponsor a sport).
 September 2006: Eureka and Lincoln Christian begin play as the ninth and tenth members of the conference.
 March 2007:  Huntingdon and LaGrange admitted to the SLIAC as affiliate members in the sport of football. The SLIAC announces football will return in the fall of 2008 after a nine-year hiatus.
 May 2007:  William Wolper hired as the Conference's first full-time Commissioner (officially started in July).
 November 2007: With the completion of the fall season, Lincoln Christian departs the SLIAC.
 September 2008: Football begins play as the 13th conference sport after a nine-year hiatus.
 September 2008: Spalding University admitted to the SLIAC to begin play during the 2009–10 academic year.
 April 2009: The SLIAC announced it would cease its sponsorship of football; five football-playing schools join the Upper Midwest Athletic Conference (UMAC) as associate members for the sport. Huntingdon and LaGrange end football affiliation with the conference.
 June 2010:  University of Dallas admitted to the SLIAC as an affiliate member in the sports of men's golf, men's and women's cross country.
 September 2010: University of Dallas is accepted as a full member into the Southern Collegiate Athletic Conference (SCAC) and drops its affiliate membership with the SLIAC after the spring men's golf season.
 December 2011:  Iowa Wesleyan College admitted to the SLIAC as a full member to begin play during the 2013–14 academic year.
 March 2020: MacMurray College announced it would close in May 2020 due to financial struggles.
 June 2020: Iowa Wesleyan announced that it would leave the NCAA and return to the NAIA after the 2020–21 academic year.
 June 2021: Mississippi University for Women admitted to the SLIAC as a full member beginning the 2022–23 academic year.
 August 2022: Lyon College admitted to the SLIAC as a full member beginning the 2023–24 academic year.

Member schools

Current members
The SLIAC currently has nine full members,. Eight are private schools and one is public:

Future member

Former members
The SLIAC had five former full members, all were private schools:

Notes

Former associate members
The SLIAC had three former associate members, all were private schools:

Membership timeline

References

External links